Thereuopodina tenuicornis is a species of centipedes in the family Scutigeridae. It is endemic to Sri Lanka.

References

tenuicornis
Animals described in 1905
Taxa named by Karl Wilhelm Verhoeff
Endemic fauna of Sri Lanka